Vezzosi is an Italian surname. Notable people with the surname include:

Alessandro Vezzosi (born 1950), Italian art critic
Antonio Francesco Vezzosi (1708–1783), Italian Theatine and biographical writer
Eloisa Reverie Vezzosi, Italian artist and author
Gabriele Vezzosi (born 1968), Italian mathematician

See also
Vezzoli

Italian-language surnames